Helmond 't Hout is a railway station in Mierlo-Hout near Helmond, Netherlands. The station opened in 1992 and is on the Venlo–Eindhoven railway. The station has 2 platforms. Train services are operated by Nederlandse Spoorwegen.

Train service
The following services stop at Helmond 't Hout:
2x per hour local services (stoptrein) 's-Hertogenbosch - Eindhoven - Deurne

External links
NS website 
Dutch Public Transport journey planner 
 Stationsweb.nl 't Hout railway station information
 Webcam at train crossing about 100 meters from Helmond 't Hout railway station

Hout
Railway stations opened in 1992
Railway stations on the Staatslijn E
1992 establishments in the Netherlands
Railway stations in the Netherlands opened in the 20th century